Dov (Dubi) Seltzer (born 26 January 1932) is a Romanian-born Israeli composer and conductor.

Biography
Dov (Dubi) Seltzer began studying music at an early age. He studied theory and harmony with professors Alfred Mendelssohn and Mihail Jora. When Seltzer immigrated to Israel at age 15, a musical comedy he had previously written continued to be played for two more years, performed by one of Bucharest's professional youth theaters. Seltzer finished his high school studies in Kibbutz Mishmar HaEmek in Israel. At the recommendation of his teacher, the pianist Frank Pelleg, Seltzer was awarded a scholarship to continue his musical studies at the Conservatories in Haifa and later on in Tel Aviv.

At 18 he joined the Israel Defense Forces and was among the founders, and the first official composer, of the Nachal Musical Theater Group (Lehakat Hanachal). The songs he wrote for the Nachal group, and the hundreds he wrote later on, are considered cornerstones of Israeli folk and popular music and are standard repertory on radio and TV worldwide.  He composed, arranged, and played accordion for the Israeli troupe Oranim Zabar, and was married to their lead singer, Geula Gill.

During his military service, Seltzer received a special grant from the army to pursue studies in composition, harmony and counterpoint with composers Herbert Bruen, Mordechai Seter, and Professor Abel Erlich. After his military service, Seltzer studied in the United States at the Mannes College of Music, receiving a diploma in composition, and then at the State University of New York, where he earned a BSc in music, majoring in conducting and composition. Among his teachers were Felix Salzer, Carl Bamberger, Roy Travis, Noah Sokolof and Robert Starer. He has also stated that he has attended The Juilliard School in New York City.

Music career
Upon his return to Israel, Seltzer embarked on an active musical career, writing in particular for musical theater. He also wrote music scores for more than forty full-length feature films, among them Israeli, American, Italian, German, and French productions.

Seltzer has to his credit several symphonic works commissioned and performed by the Israel Philharmonic Orchestra and the Jerusalem Symphony Orchestra. He has conducted both orchestras in concerts of his own works – the first Israeli composer to be thus recognized and honored. His works were performed by all the major Israeli orchestras, as well as by the New York Philharmonic, the Queens Symphony, and the British Chamber Orchestra. His works were conducted and played by artists such as Zubin Mehta, Kurt Masur, Yehudi Menuhin, and Yitzhak Perlman.

Awards and recognition 
Seltzer has twice received the Kinor David (Israel's "Oscar") as well as the Judges' Award by the Society of Authors, Composers and Music Publishers in Israel (ACUM) for lifetime achievement.  In 2009 he was awarded the Israel Prize for lifetime achievement and contribution to Israeli music.

 1967 – The musical Rumpelstiltskin, music by Dov Seltzer, received the Prize of the City of Tel Aviv as the Best Musical Play of the Year.
 1968 – Awarded the Kinor David (Harp of David), the Israeli "Oscar", as the Best Screen and Theater Composer of the Year.
 1969 – The stage version of the musical Kazablan, music by Dov Seltzer, received the Prize of the City of Tel Aviv as the Best Musical Play of the Year.
 1970 – Awarded the Kinor David as the Best Screen and Theater Composer of the Year.
 1971 – The film Yadaim (Hands), music by Dov Seltzer, was awarded the Prize of the Ministry of Industry and Commerce as Best Documentary Film and Best Score for a Documentary Film.
 1973 – The film I Love You Rosa by Moshé Mizrahi, music by Dov Seltzer, was nominated for an Academy Award in the category of Best Foreign Film. The film also represented Israel at the Cannes Film Festival and the score was cited by the judges.
 1974 – The title song of the musical Kazablan (film version) was nominated for a Golden Globe Award.
 1985 – Received Itzik Manger Prize for contribution to Jewish and Yiddish Music and Culture.
 1985 – Received ACUM Jury Award for lifetime achievement in music.
 1989 – Received Sholom Aleichem House Award for Contribution and Creativity in the field of Jewish Culture.
 2000 – Received Prime Minister's Prize for Israeli composers for his work Lament for Yitzhak.
 2006 – Received the Prize of The Minister of Culture, Science and Sport for Lifetime Activity in the field of Israeli Song and Music.
 2009 – Received the Israel Prize for his lifetime contribution to the different genres of Israeli music including songs, musicals, film scores, and symphonic music.
 2014 – Received the Theater Prize for Lifetime Achievement

Musicals
(Partial list)
 The Megilah – Musical based on the poetic libretto Songs of the Megillah (in Yiddish) by the famous poet Itzik Manger. After the original run (450 performances), the musical had five additional theater productions (one of them on Broadway) and three film versions.
 Kazablan – the most successful original musical in the history of Israeli Theater. Also a film version (title song nominated for the Golden Globe).
 I Like Mike – Musical produced at the Alhambra Theater in Tel Aviv (one year run).
 To Live Another Summer – at the Helen Hayes Theater on Broadway.
 Comme la neige en été – at the Théâtre des Variétés in Paris.
 Ootz Li Gootz Li (Rumpelstilskin) – Musical for children (more than 1,500 performances in 8 different productions for more than thirty years).
 Choumesh Lider (Songs of the Bible) – Musical (in Hebrew and Yiddish) based on a poetic cycle by Itzik Manger (four different productions).

Film Scores
(Partial list)
 Escape to the Sun - A Menahem Golan film, starring Laurence Harvey.
 Entebbe: Operation Thunderbolt – a Golan/Globus Production (Action Military).
 The Assisi Underground – Starring Ben Cross and Maximilian Schell. Italian Production film and TV Miniseries (World War II Drama).
 The Ambassador – A J. Lee Thompson film, starring Robert Mitchum and Rock Hudson (Drama).
 Forced Witness – A Raphael Rebibo film, starring Anat Atzmon(1984)(Drame).
 Buba – First Prize at the Rio Film Festival (1987) (Thriller).
 Moses the Lawgiver – Starring Burt Lancaster. 7-hour TV series and movie version (R.A.I. TV/Italy. ITV/London).
 A Place by The sea – A Raphael Rebibo film, starring Anat Zahor and Alon Aboutboul(1989)(Love Story).
 Kazablan – Musical film based on the original stage success (1967). Distributed worldwide by M.G.M. (Title song nominated for a Golden Globe).
 I Love You Rosa – A Moshé Mizrahi film nominated for an Oscar in the category of the best foreign film.
 Ramat Aviv Gimel – Music and title song for the longest running Israeli TV series.

Symphonic Works
 Stempeniu – a dramatic poem based on the novel by Shalom Aleichem. The work is for actor/narrator, solo violin, and symphony orchestra. It was commissioned and given its premiere performance by Maestro Zubin Mehta with the Israel Philharmonic Orchestra. (Repeat performances by the Jerusalem Symphony Orchestra and the Ra'anana Symphonette).
 Rhapsodie Hassidique – for violin and enlarged chamber orchestra, was commissioned and performed by Yehudi Menuhin in London with the English Chamber Orchestra, conducted by the composer. (Repeat performances by the Ra'anana Symphonette and the Europa Philharmonie with Michael Guttman playing the solo part).
 This Scroll – an ode to the Israeli Declaration of Independence, written for baritone solo, mixed choir, and symphony orchestra. The work was composed in honour of the 100th anniversary of the birth of David Ben-Gurion. World premiere by the Haifa Symphony Orchestra, conducted by Stanley Sperber. Solo baritone – Yehoram Gaon. (Repeat performances by the Israel Philharmonic Orchestra, the Queens Symphony, and the Beer-Sheva Symphonette).
 The Gold of the Ashes – a symphonic poem with solo mezzo-soprano, children's choir, and symphony orchestra. Composed for the 500-year commemoration of the expulsion of Jews from Spain. The world premiere of the work was performed by the Jerusalem Symphony Orchestra, conducted by the composer.
 The Poetry and Prophecy of the Bible – a symphonic suite with narrators reading texts from the Bible, including "The Creation", "The Expulsion from Paradise", "By the Rivers of Babylon", "The Vision of Isa'ya", and "Song of Songs" (record featuring Theodore Bikel as narrator, the Vienna Symphony, and Dov Seltzer conducting).
 Tradition – nine old Jewish songs, arranged for violin and symphony orchestra. CD featuring Yitzhak Perlman and the Israel Philharmonic Orchestra conducted by the composer. Live performance by the IPO conducted by Zubin Mehta.
 Lament for Yitzhak – a Requiem in memory of Yitzhak Rabin was premiered in April 1998 by the Israel Philharmonic Orchestra, with the New Israeli Opera Choir, the Ankor Children's Choir, and four soloists, under the baton of Maestro Zubin Mehta, at the Mann Auditorium in Tel Aviv, as the festive opening of Israel's 50th anniversary celebrations. Repeat performance by the New York Philharmonic, conducted by Maestro Kurt Masur at Avery Fisher Hall – 1999 Lincoln Center Festival. Repeat performance by the Santa Cecilia Choir and Orchestra conducted by maestro Lorin Maazel, Auditorium Santa Cecilia, Roma, Italy.
 Evening of Life – Cycle of four songs to words by Avraham Sutzkever, written for symphonic orchestra and soprano solo. Premiered in October 2007 by the Israel Philharmonic Orchestra under the baton of maestro Zubin Mehta.
 Esmeralda – based on the famous novel by Victor Hugo, "The Hunchback of Notre Dame". Libretto by the French writer Jacques Rampal.

Discography
(Partial list)
 "Hora! Songs and Dances of Israel" by the Oranim Zabar Troupe (with Geula Gill), Elektra, 1960
 Songs after the War – with Geula Gil Trio, 1967
 Ootz Li Gootz Li – Musical, the Cameri Theater of Tel Aviv
 Hamegileh – Musical with the Burstein family
 Kazablan – Musical
 I like Mike – Musical
 Yehoram Gaon 79 – songs of Haim Heffer and Dov Seltzer 1979
 Revisor – Musical
 Tradition – Jewish melodies, with Yitzhak Perlman and the Israel Philharmonic Orchestra
 Humesh Lieder – Musical
 The Best of Dov Seltzer – song selection
 Lament for Yitzhak – with the Israel Philharmonic Orchestra, conductor Zubin Mehta

Song Book
 The Melody Maker, Kineret, Zmora-Bitan, Dvir Publishing House Ltd. 2011

See also
Music in Israel

References

1932 births
20th-century classical composers
20th-century conductors (music)
21st-century classical composers
21st-century conductors (music)
Israeli classical composers
Israeli conductors (music)
Israeli film score composers
Israeli military musicians
Living people
Male classical composers
Male film score composers
Male musical theatre composers
Romanian emigrants to Israel
Itzik Manger Prize recipients

External links
  Dov Seltzer website